DeSanctis–Cacchione syndrome or Xeroderma pigmentosum is a genetic disorder characterized by the skin and eye symptoms of xeroderma pigmentosum (XP) occurring in association with microcephaly, progressive intellectual disability, slowed growth and sexual development, deafness, choreoathetosis, ataxia and quadriparesis.

Genetics
In at least some case,  the gene lesion involves a mutation in the CSB gene.

It can be associated with ERCC6.

Diagnosis

Treatment

See also 
 Xeroderma pigmentosum
 List of cutaneous conditions

References

External links 

Genodermatoses
DNA replication and repair-deficiency disorders
Rare syndromes
Syndromes affecting the skin
Syndromes affecting the eye
Syndromes affecting head size
Syndromes with intellectual disability
Syndromes affecting the nervous system
Syndromes affecting hearing